Dichomeris autometra is a moth of the family Gelechiidae. It was described by Edward Meyrick in 1934. It is known from Taiwan and Sichuan, China.

The wingspan is 6-6.3 mm.

The larvae feed on Lithospermum species.

References

autometra
Moths described in 1934